The Taipei Metro Dapinglin station (formerly transliterated as Ta Pinglin Station until 2003) is located in Xindian District, New Taipei, Taiwan. It is a station on the Songshan–Xindian line and the Circular line.

Circular Line construction at the station began on 8 October 2010.

Station overview

This four-level, underground station, has two island platforms and five exits.

Due to the plans for the Circular line being unknown during construction of the Xindian line, there was no space reserved for the transfer to the future Circular line. This can be noted in today's transfer route at Dapinglin station, where passengers from the Songshan–Xindian line (B2) transferring to the Circular line (B4) or vice versa need to go to the concourse (B1) first before transferring to the other line, whereas at Zhongxiao Xinsheng station, which had reserved space for transferring to the Xinzhuang line during the construction of the Nangang line, can go directly from the Nangang line (B2) to the Xinzhuang line (B3) or vice versa without having to go to the concourse (B1).

Station History
 11 November 1999: Station opened
 31 January 2020: The circular line opens for service.

Station layout

Around the station
 Jing-Mei White Terror Memorial Park
 Muzha Riverside Park

References

Railway stations opened in 1999
1999 establishments in Taiwan
Songshan–Xindian line stations
Circular line stations (Taipei Metro)